Fail You Again is the debut studio album by New Jersey rock band, Can't Swim. The album was released through Pure Noise on March 10, 2017.

Background 
Rumors swirled about a full-length album after the band released their first single off the album, called "Stranger" on November 17, 2016. The same day the music video for the song was also released. The video features the band in various scenes in the dark in a car sitting outside a house of a couple breaking up and fighting.

The band announced the debut of their full-length album to Alternative Press on February 8, 2017. The same day, they released the music video to their single "We Won't Sleep".

Track listing

Personnel

Can't Swim
 Christopher LoPorto – lead vocals, backup vocals, guitar, drums (track 4, 7, 8, 12)
 Greg McDevitt – bass, backup vocals
 Michael Sanchez – guitar, backup vocals
 Danny Rico – drums (track 1-3, 5, 6, 9-11 ), backup vocals, guitar

Additional personnel
 Lucy Clementoni – backup vocals (tracks 5, 6, 11)

Production
 Danny Rico – producer, engineer, mixer
 Ted Jensen - mastering
 Brendan Walter - artwork, layout

References

External links 
 Fail You Again via Pure Noise Records Bandcamp

2017 debut albums
Can't Swim albums
Pure Noise Records albums